Richard R. Hamilton (born April 19, 1970) is a former American football linebacker in the National Football League for the Washington Redskins, the Kansas City Chiefs, and the New York Jets.  He played college football at the University of Central Florida. He also played for the Orlando Predators and Los Angeles Avengers of the Arena Football League.

External links
Just Sports Stats

https://ucfknights.com/sports/2018/7/26/211736242.aspx

1970 births
Living people
People from Inverness, Florida
American football linebackers
UCF Knights football players
Washington Redskins players
Kansas City Chiefs players
New York Jets players
Barcelona Dragons players
Orlando Predators players
Los Angeles Avengers players